"Where the Stars and Stripes and the Eagle Fly" is a song written by Kenny Beard, Casey Beathard, and co-written and recorded by American country music singer Aaron Tippin. The song reached number 2 on the Billboard Hot Country Singles & Tracks chart for one week, held from the top spot by Alan Jackson's "Where Were You (When the World Stopped Turning)". In addition to this, 'Fly' also peaked at number 20 on the Billboard Hot 100, marking Tippin's first and, to date, only entry into the Top 20. The song did reach number 1 in R&R. In addition, it was Tippin's last single to reach the Top Ten on the country charts. The song was released in the wake of the September 11 attacks. All proceeds from the single went to the Red Cross and its relief efforts for the families of the September 11 attacks. According to then label president, Randy Goodman, the single raised approximately $250,000.

Content
Tippin had written the song with Kenny Beard and Casey Beathard for his 2000 album People Like Us, but it did not make the cut. He says, "But now, I know exactly why it didn't. It had a bigger purpose." Two days after the September 11 attacks, he went to a Nashville studio to record the song.

The lyrics of the song offer a highly patriotic view of the United States.

Music video
The music video was directed by Trey Fanjoy and it was filmed in September 2001. It was filmed in many different locations around New York City and shows citizens of New York and the rubble of the World Trade Center.

Chart performance
"Where the Stars and Stripes and the Eagle Fly" debuted at number 34 on the U.S. Billboard Hot Country Singles & Tracks chart for the week of October 6, 2001.

Year-end charts

References

2001 singles
Aaron Tippin songs
American patriotic songs
Songs written by Casey Beathard
Music videos directed by Trey Fanjoy
Lyric Street Records singles
Songs written by Aaron Tippin
Songs written by Kenny Beard
2001 songs